The Michael Moon Band was a New York–based alternative rock group active in the late 1990s. Michael Moon was the stage name for Michael Anthony Franano. Franano, formerly from the bands The Front and Bakers Pink and The Michael Moon Band released one pop album in 1998 titled, You.  The Michael Moon Band made a cameo appearance under the name Michael Moon/El Flamingo Band in the Woody Allen / Miramax film, Celebrity, performing the single Chanel No. 5 in a club scene while Kenneth Branagh dances with Charlize Theron.  Michael is also credited for writing, composing and performing the music on Lynn's Wake, an independent film and Winner of the Best Short Screenplay in the Atlantic City Film Festival in 1999.

Band members
Michael Moon (Franano) – Vocals, Guitars, drum programming
Murphy Occhino – Drums, Vocals

Additional Personnel
Mark Eddinger – Piano, Keyboards
Andy Burton – Keyboards
Chris DeLisa – Drums

Discography

Albums
You, Michael Moon (1998, Mutiny Records)
Release Date: Nov 03, 1998
Format: CD
Record Label: Mutiny Records
UPC: 600238001925
Genre: Rock

See also
Bakers Pink
The Front
Michael Anthony Franano

External links
Michael Moon on Facebook
YouTube channel
Michael Franano's website

References

Musical groups established in 1997
Alternative rock groups from New York (state)